Dinn Corporation was a roller coaster designing and manufacturing company established in West Chester, Ohio, in 1983 by Charles Dinn. The company is noted for moving and rebuilding several existing wooden coasters and building ten new wooden roller coasters in the United States.

History
Charles Dinn served as Kings Island's Director of Construction, Maintenance and Engineering, where he oversaw the design and building of  The Beast with a team including Al Collins, Jim Nickell, William Reed and Curtis D. Summers. In November 1983, Dinn left Kings Island and opened his own corporation in West Chester, Ohio. The corporation relocated three older wooden roller coasters from parks that had been closed to new parks One of the firm's first projects was rebuilding the San Antonio Playland Park Rocket as the Phoenix at Knoebels Amusement Resort. In 1985 Dinn contacted Curtis D. Summers, Inc., an engineering firm in Loveland, Ohio, to provide the design for the restoration of the helix of Paragon Park's Giant Coaster which his company was moving to Wild World in Largo, Maryland. That was the start of relationship that lasted until 1991. In 1987 the two started building new coasters, with Wolverine Wildcat and Raging Wolf Bobs both opening in 1988.

In 1991, Dinn closed the Dinn Corporation after a dispute that occurred during the construction of Pegasus at Efteling. This was despite a possible project in the works for Kings Island to open in 1992. However, his daughter Denise Dinn Larrick formed the now-defunct company Custom Coasters International, with many of the key personnel from the Dinn Corp.

On July 6, 2021, Dinn died at the age of 88 in Clermont, Florida.

List of roller coasters

As of 2019, Dinn Corporation has built 11 roller coasters around the world and assisted with at least 3 known restoration.

Relocated/rebuilt coasters

New coasters

Water projects
The Dinn Corporation served as project managers on the following ride installations:
 Raging Rapids, Kennywood
 The Grand Rapids, Boardwalk and Baseball
 Zoom Flume, Lake Compounce
 Paradise Island, Wild World

References

Companies based in Ohio
Roller coaster manufacturers
Manufacturing companies established in 1983
Manufacturing companies disestablished in 1991
1983 establishments in Ohio